La liga de las muchachas ("The League of Girls") is a 1950 Mexican film. It was written by Luis Alcoriza, who also stars in the film.

Cast
 Elsa Aguirre - Dorita
 Miroslava - Marta
 Rubén Rojo - Pablo
 Consuelo Guerrero de Luna - Doña Remedios
 Jorge Reyes - Amado
 Alma Rosa Aguirre - Amelia
 José Ángel Espinosa 'Ferrusquilla' - Mario (as José A. Espinosa 'Ferrusquilla')
 Rosina Pagã - (as Rosina Pagan)
 Luis Alcoriza		
 Conchita Carracedo - Irene
 Antonio Bravo - Don Adolfo del Toro
 Magda Donato - Celestina
 Óscar Pulido		
 Antonio R. Frausto - Don Pedro
 Francisco Aguayo

External links
 

1950 films
1950s Spanish-language films
Mexican black-and-white films
1950 drama films
Mexican drama films
1950s Mexican films